Jessamy Helen Stoddart (born 20 June 1993) is an English actress. She is known for taking over the role of Liberty Savage in the Channel 4 soap opera Hollyoaks, having portrayed the role since 2018. Prior to joining the soap, Stoddart appeared in numerous theatre productions, including Legally Blonde, Mack and Mabel, Follies and Songs for a New World.

Early and personal life
Stoddart was born on 20 June 1993 in the London Borough of Barking and Dagenham. She studied at the National Youth Music Theatre and the Guildford School of Acting, graduating from the latter in 2014. Stoddart announced her engagement to her long-term partner Ryan O'Gorman in December 2020. The couple got married in November 2021. In August 2022, Stoddart announced that she and O'Gorman were expecting their first child. Their daughter was born on 4 January 2023

Career
Stoddart began her career in stage productions and musicals, and portrayed characters such as Vivienne in Legally Blonde, Mabel in Mack and Mabel, a young Phyllis in Follies and Company in Songs for a New World. She has also appeared in various ensemble roles and as an understudy in Little Women, Les Misérables and Wicked. In 2016, she made her television debut in an episode of the Channel 4 sitcom The Windsors, portraying a witch in the fourth episode of the first series.

In June 2018, Stoddart joined the cast of the Channel 4 soap opera Hollyoaks, taking over the role of Liberty Savage, who had previously been portrayed by Abi Phillips. Since joining the soap, her storylines have included coming to terms with the death of the character's father Dirk Savage (David Kennedy), agreeing to be a surrogate and suffering from post-partum psychosis. For her portrayal of Liberty, she was nominated for Best Comedy Performance at the British Soap Awards in 2019, but lost out to Sarah Moyle who plays Valerie Pitman in Doctors.

Filmography

Stage

Awards and nominations

References

External links
 

1993 births
21st-century English actresses
English stage actresses
English soap opera actresses
English television actresses
Living people
People from the London Borough of Barking and Dagenham